Boatin Island is the rocky island off the northwest coast of Robert Island in the South Shetland Islands extending 740 m in north–south direction and 150 m wide.  It ends in the T-shaped 250 m wide Hammer Point to the north, and connected to Robert Island to the south by a 250 m long moraine tombolo.  The feature was formed as a result of the retreat of Robert Island's ice cap during the first decade of 21st century.  The area was visited by early 19th century sealers.

Location

Maps
 Livingston Island to King George Island.  Scale 1:200000.  Admiralty Nautical Chart 1776.  Taunton: UK Hydrographic Office, 1968.
 L.L. Ivanov. Antarctica: Livingston Island and Greenwich, Robert, Snow and Smith Islands. Scale 1:120000 topographic map. Troyan: Manfred Wörner Foundation, 2009.  (Second edition 2010)
Antarctic Digital Database (ADD). Scale 1:250000 topographic map of Antarctica. Scientific Committee on Antarctic Research (SCAR). Since 1993, regularly upgraded and updated.

References
 Boatin Island. SCAR Composite Antarctic Gazetteer.
 Bulgarian Antarctic Gazetteer. Antarctic Place-names Commission. (details in Bulgarian, basic data in English)

External links
 Boatin Island. Copernix satellite image

Islands of Robert Island
Bulgaria and the Antarctic